Matthew Jon Freeman (born 9 December 1997) is a New Zealand basketball player who plays for the PS Karlsruhe Lions of the German ProA.

College career
In 2019, he joined the UC Santa Barbara Gauchos.

Professional career
Freemand started his professional career with the Gladiators Trier of the German ProA where he signed in December 2020.
He joined the PS Karlsruhe Lions shortly before the start of the 2020–21 ProA season.

References

External links
Profile at Eurobasket.com
Profile at Karlsruhe Lions website
Profile at German ProA league website
Profile at scoutBasketball
Profile at RealGM
Profile at Proballers

1997 births
Living people
Basketball players from Auckland
Franklin Bulls players
New Zealand expatriate basketball people in Germany
New Zealand men's basketball players
Power forwards (basketball)
PS Karlsruhe Lions players
UC Santa Barbara Gauchos men's basketball players